An ordinary election for the first full bench of 18 judges of the International Criminal Court was held during the first resumption of the 1st session of the Assembly of States Parties to the Rome Statute of the International Criminal Court in New York between 3 and 7 February 2003.

Background 
The judges elected at this election were to take office on 11 March 2003. Six judges were to remain in office until 2006 (re-eligible), six until 2009 (not re-eligible) and another six for the whole nine-year term until 2012 (not re-eligible).

The election was governed by the Rome Statute of the International Criminal Court. Its article 36(8)(a) states that "[t]he States Parties shall, in the selection of judges, take into account the need, within the membership of the Court, for:
 (i) The representation of the principal legal systems of the world;
 (ii) Equitable geographical representation; and
 (iii) A fair representation of female and male judges."

Furthermore, article 36(3)(b) and 36(5) provide for two lists:
 List A contains those judges that "[h]ave established competence in criminal law and procedure, and the necessary relevant experience, whether as judge, prosecutor, advocate or in other similar capacity, in criminal proceedings";
 List B contains those who "[h]ave established competence in relevant areas of international law such as international humanitarian law and the law of human rights, and extensive experience in a professional legal capacity which is of relevance to the judicial work of the Court".

Each candidate must belong to exactly one list.

Nomination process 
Following the rules, the nomination period of judges for the 2003 election lasted from 9 September to 30 November 2002. The following persons were nominated:

The candidature of Kocou A. Capo-Chichi of Benin was withdrawn.

Minimum voting requirements 
Minimum voting requirements governed part of the election. This was to ensure that article 36(8)(a) cited above is fulfilled. The following minimum voting requirements existed:

Regarding the List A or B requirement, there was a minimum voting requirement (not to be waived at any time) of nine judges from List A and five judges from List B.

Regarding the regional criteria, there were minimum voting requirements for three African, two Asian, two Eastern European judges, three Latin American and Caribbean judges and three judges from Western European and Other States.

Regarding the gender criteria, there was a minimum voting requirement for six female and six male judges.

The voting requirements were as follows:

Ballots 
The ballots took place in February 2003.

References

 Election,2003
2003 elections
Non-partisan elections
2003